John Turner (1 November 1854 – 22 October 1912) was an English first-class cricketer.

Turner was born at Northampton in November 1854. He played first-class cricket for the Marylebone Cricket Club (MCC), making his debut for the club against Yorkshire at Lord's in 1876. He played first-class cricket for the MCC until 1883, making a total of twenty first-class matches, including one match for the Gentlemen of Marylebone Cricket Club against Kent at the Canterbury Cricket Week of 1876. A right-handed batsman, he scored 417 runs from his twenty matches at an average of 12.26. He made one half century, a score of 65 against Kent in 1881. By profession he was a merchant and had retired to Bexhill-on-Sea in his later years. Turner suffered from depression and had previously been admitted to a mental hospital. He committed suicide by shooting himself in the forehead on the morning of 22 October 1912, with his body being found by his wife 15 minutes later.

References

External links

1854 births
1912 deaths
People from Northampton
English cricketers
Marylebone Cricket Club cricketers
Gentlemen of Marylebone Cricket Club cricketers
English merchants
Suicides by firearm in England
19th-century English businesspeople
1912 suicides